Nightmare Academy is a 2002 novel by Frank Peretti, the second book in the Veritas Project series.

Nightmare Academy may also refer to:

The Nightmare Academy series novels by Dean Lorey:
 Nightmare Academy: Monster Hunters (2007) also released as Nightmare Academy: Charlie's Monsters (2008)
 Nightmare Academy: Monster Madness (2008)
 Nightmare Academy: Monster War also released as Nightmare Academy: Monster Revenge (2009)